The slender sole (Lyopsetta exilis) is a flatfish of the family Pleuronectidae. Its native habitat is the eastern Pacific coast, from the mouth of the Alsek River in Alaska in the north to Isla Cedros in Baja California, Mexico in the south.

Diet
The slender sole's diet consists of zoobenthos crustaceans such as krill, mysids, amphipods and shrimps, as well as marine worms and some fish.

Commercial fishing
The slender sole is harvested by the commercial fishing industry, and is considered to be a good food fish, but it is not landed in significant quantities due to its small size.

References

Pleuronectidae
Fish of the Pacific Ocean
Western North American coastal fauna
Fish described in 1880
Taxa named by David Starr Jordan
Taxa named by Charles Henry Gilbert